Tiruchengodu Ramalingam Sundaram Mudaliar (16 July 1907 – 30 August 1963) was an Indian actor, director, and producer. He was the founder of the Salem-based film production company Modern Theatres.

Early life 

Sundaram was born in 1907 from Sengunthar Kaikola Mudaliar Community in Tiruchengodu in Salem district to a wealthy textile merchant V.V.C.Ramalingam Mudaliar and had his studies in India and in Leeds, England, where he graduated in textile engineering. On returning to India, he managed his family business. After the production of the first Tamil talkie Kalidas in 1931, the film industry emerged as a profitable means of investment. Sundaram set up Angel Pictures in Salem and produced movies along with S. S. Velayutham. He was brother of famous textile merchant
V. V. C. R. Murugesa Mudaliar.

Film career 
Sundaram split with Velayutham after a few years and set up his own production company The Modern Theatres Ltd. The first film produced under the banner of Modern Theatres was Sathi Ahalya in 1937. The next year, Sundaram produced the Malayalam film Balan (1938). His 1944 film Arundathi was a commercial success and completed 100 days at the theatres. Sundaram was instrumental in giving M. G. Ramachandran his first major solo box office hit in Manthiri Kumari. They followed it up with Sarvadhikari.

Filmography
Sathi Ahalya (1937)
Balan (1938)
Arundathi (1944)
Manthiri Kumari (1950)
Sarvadhikari (1951)

Awards

National Film Awards
 1961: Certificate of Merit for Second Best Feature Film in Malayalam – Kandam Becha Kottu

References

External links 
 

1907 births
1963 deaths
Film directors from Tamil Nadu
People from Coimbatore
Malayalam film producers
Tamil film producers
Film producers from Tamil Nadu
Odia film directors
Filmmaking pioneers